Patrick Lefevere (born 6 January 1955) is a Belgian former professional cyclist, who currently serves as the general manager of UCI WorldTeam . According to the ranking site Cycling Ranking he is the most successful cycling manager in history.

Career

Lefevere is from Flanders, the Dutch-speaking region of the north and was a professional racer from 1976 to 1979, winning Kuurne–Brussels–Kuurne and the fourth stage in the Vuelta a España, both in 1978.

When his sports career ended, Lefevere began a new enterprise as a directeur sportif (team coach). In 1980, he was directeur sportif at Marc Superia and then spent time at Capri Sonne (1981–1982). From 1985 to 1987, he was with Lotto; in 1988 he joined Tvm and from 1989 until 1991 he was with Weinnman.

From 1991 to 1994, Lefevere was one of the orchestrators behind team MG-GB, with riders such as Franco Ballerini and Mario Cipollini.

Lefevere became directeur sportif of Mapei in 1995, a team which was known for its success in one-day races. Riders included Johan Museeuw and Michele Bartoli. In 2001, Lefevere returned to Belgium and created Domo-Farm Frites, with which he won several races, including two Paris–Roubaix (Knaven, Museeuw).

In 2001, Lefevere was declared cancer-free after being diagnosed with a pancreatic tumor in September 2000. A few months later, he resumed his role in Mapei.

In July 2002, after the Mapei team announced it was withdrawing from racing, Lefevere joined with the owners of Quick-Step, Frans De Cock, and the head of Davitamon, Marc Coucke, to announce the founding of team .

The team changed denomination several times but always had Quick-Step as its primary sponsor. The formation became a point of reference in one-day races thanks to victories by Paolo Bettini, twice World Champion, Olympic Champion and record victory holder in the Classics, along with Tom Boonen, who made his mark more than a few times at the Paris–Roubaix and in the Tour of Flanders, won a World Championship and took home the green jersey in the 2007 Tour. In the early years of 2000, the team could also count on Richard Virenque who, as part of the team, became the record-man for victories when it came to the polka dot jersey for best climber (7 times).

In October 2010, Lefevere formed a joint venture with the Czech businessman Zdeněk Bakala, who became the owner of the team. After a transitional 2011, in 2012 the team became , with Lefevere as CEO.

In 2012, the team won 60 official victories, including the Paris–Roubaix, the Tour of Flanders and the first edition of the World Championship Team Time Trials, 9 national titles and the World Championship Time Trial with Tony Martin.

In 2013, with the arrival of Mark Cavendish, the team had more than 50 victories to its name, including five stages at the Giro d’Italia and four stages at the Tour de France.

In 2014, Michał Kwiatkowski of  won the rainbow jersey at the 2014 UCI World Road Race Championships in Ponferrada, Spain.

Major results
Sources:
1975
 1st Stage 4 Olympia's Tour
1976
 1st Stage 6a Vuelta Ciclista a la Comunidad Valenciana
 5th Le Samyn
 9th Brussel-Ingooigem
1977
 2nd GP Victor Standaert
 8th Overall Ronde van Nederland
 10th Dwars door België
1978
 1st Kuurne-Brussels-Kuurne
 1st Stage 4 Vuelta a España
 6th Overall Tour Méditerranéen Cycliste Professionnel
1979
 4th Le Samyn
 8th GP du Tournaisis

References

External links

Patrick Lefevere's Team Manager page on Cycling Ranking
Omegapharma-Quickstep
Bicycling
CQ Ranking
Cycling News

Belgian male cyclists
Belgian Vuelta a España stage winners
Cycle racing in Belgium
1955 births
Living people
Cyclists from West Flanders
Quick-Step Alpha Vinyl Team
People from Moorslede
Directeur sportifs